Takhteh-ye Kazemabad (also Romanized as Takhteh-ye Kāẓemābād) is a village in Tus Rural District, in the Central District of Mashhad County, Razavi Khorasan Province, Iran. At the 2006 census, its population was 224, in 59 families.

References 

Populated places in Mashhad County